Mitromorpha brachyspira is an extinct species of sea snail, a marine gastropod mollusk in the family Mitromorphidae.

Description

Distribution
This extinct species is endemic to New Zealand.

References

 Suter, Henry. Descriptions of New Tertiary Mollusca Occurring in New Zealand Part I. 1917.
 Maxwell, P.A. (2009). Cenozoic Mollusca. pp. 232–254 in Gordon, D.P. (ed.) New Zealand inventory of biodiversity. Volume one. Kingdom Animalia: Radiata, Lophotrochozoa, Deuterostomia. Canterbury University Press, Christchurch.

brachyspira
Gastropods described in 1917
Gastropods of New Zealand